The Ministry of Labour was a government agency in Kazakhstan that existed from 1991 to 1996. It was established on 14 March 1991 after a Presidential Decree No. 281 "On the transformation of the State Committee of the Kazakh SSR on labor and social issues to the Ministry of Labour of the Kazakh SSR". The ministry existed until November 1996, when it was along with the Ministry of Social Protection formed into Ministry of Labour and Social Protection.

List of ministers 

 Saiat Beisenov (14 March 1991 – 24 November 1993)
 Viktor Sobolev (24 November 1993 – 11 October 1994)
 Peter Krepak (13 October 1994 – 11 November 1996)

References 

1991 establishments in Kazakhstan
Labour
Ministries established in 1991